is a Japanese football player. He plays for MIO Biwako Shiga.

Club statistics

References

External links

1986 births
Living people
Osaka Gakuin University alumni
Association football people from Nara Prefecture
Japanese footballers
J2 League players
Japan Football League players
Fagiano Okayama players
Zweigen Kanazawa players
Renofa Yamaguchi FC players
Nara Club players
MIO Biwako Shiga players
Association football defenders